Walter Goodman (29 September 1872 – 13 April 1910) was a Barbadian cricketer. He played in fifteen first-class matches for Barbados and British Guiana from 1891 to 1902.

References

External links
 

1872 births
1910 deaths
Barbadian cricketers
Barbados cricketers
Guyana cricketers
People from Saint Philip, Barbados